Mthuli ka Shezi (1947–1972) was a South African playwright and political activist.  He was a student activist when he attended the University of Zululand, and in 1972 he was elected the first vice president of the Black People's Convention.  His writing reflected the struggle of recovering African identity in colonial and post-colonial societies, a topic which reflects his involvement in Steve Biko's Black Consciousness Movement as well as the influence of Frantz Fanon.

In December 1972, Shezi died when he was pushed in front of a moving train at Germiston station after coming to the defense of African women being drenched with water by a white station cleaner. He posthumously received the Order of Luthuli for his "political leadership, outstanding contribution to the performing arts, and activism against apartheid."

He became a symbol for the struggle of black South Africans against the apartheid regime.

Quote
"I am black/
Black like my mother/
Black like the sufferers/
Black like the continent" - from the play Shanti published in 1972

References

South African dramatists and playwrights
Anti-apartheid activists
Assassinated activists
1947 births
1972 deaths
Assassinated South African people
People murdered in South Africa
University of Zululand alumni
20th-century dramatists and playwrights